James Patrick Deagan (22 March 1898 – 20 November 1979) was an Australian rules footballer who played with St Kilda in the Victorian Football League (VFL).

Notes

External links 

1898 births
1979 deaths
Australian rules footballers from Victoria (Australia)
St Kilda Football Club players